Serena Williams was the defending champion, but lost in the final 7–5, 6–2 against Nathalie Tauziat.

Seeds
The top four seeds received a bye to the second round.

Draw

Finals

Top half

Bottom half

External links
 Official results archive (ITF)
 Official results archive (WTA)

Singles
Open Gaz de France